Qualification is either the process of qualifying for an achievement, or a credential attesting to that achievement, and may refer to:

 Professional qualification, attributes developed by obtaining academic degrees or through professional experience
 Qualification badge, a decoration of People's Liberation Army Type 07 indicating military rank or length of service
 Qualifications-Based Selection (QBS), a competitive contract procurement process established by the United States Congress
 Qualifications for professional social work, professional degrees in social work in various nations
 Qualification problem, the impossibility of listing all the preconditions required for an action to have its intended effect
 Qualification principle, in programming language theory, the statement that syntactic classes may admit local definitions
 Qualification types in the United Kingdom, different levels of academic, vocational or skills-related education achievements
 International Qualification Examination, taken by foreign accountants to become a Certified Public Accountant in the United States
 Pre-qualification (lending), a process by which a lending institution estimates how much it is willing to lend to a borrower
 School leaving qualification, academic qualification awarded for the completion of high school in various times and countries
 Scottish Vocational Qualification, certificate of vocational education in Scotland
 :Category:Qualification for sports events
 World Cup qualification (disambiguation)

See also
 
 

Former disambiguation pages converted to set index articles